Postlagerkarte (literally mail storage card; abbreviated PLK) was a German postal service that enabled customers to receive mail anonymously, without providing any identification documents. It was introduced by the German Imperial Post in 1910 and abolished in 1991.

See also
P.O. box

References
Gleb J. Albert, The PLK: A Crucial Communication Tool, November 15, 2015.

Postal system of Germany
1910 establishments in Germany
1991 disestablishments in Germany